Volodymyr Herashchenko (born 27 April 1968) is a Ukrainian professional football coach and a former player.

Career
He made his professional debut in the Soviet Top League in 1985 for Dnipro Dnipropetrovsk.

He became secretary general of the Ukrainian National Olympic Committee, but was suspended in May 2012 after being recorded offering a British newspaper reporter, posing as a tout, up to 100 Olympic tickets. He subsequently said he was 'humouring' the reporter and not really offering the tickets.

Honours
 Soviet Top League champion: 1988.
 Soviet Top League runner-up: 1987, 1989.
 Soviet Top League bronze: 1985.
 Soviet Cup winner: 1989.
 USSR Super Cup winner: 1989.
 USSR Federation Cup winner: 1989.
 USSR Federation Cup finalist: 1990.
 Russian Premier League runner-up: 1993, 1997.
 Russian Premier League bronze: 1996.
 Russian Cup finalist: 1995.
 Ukrainian Premier League bronze: 2001.

European club competitions
 UEFA Cup 1988–89 with FC Dnipro Dnipropetrovsk: 1 game.
 European Cup 1989–90 with FC Dnipro Dnipropetrovsk: 6 games.
 UEFA Cup 1990–91 with FC Dnipro Dnipropetrovsk: 2 games.
 UEFA Cup 1994–95 with FC Rotor Volgograd: 2 games, 1 goal.
 UEFA Cup 1995–96 with FC Rotor Volgograd: 3 games.
 UEFA Intertoto Cup 1996 with FC Rotor Volgograd: 3 games.
 UEFA Cup 1997–98 with FC Rotor Volgograd: 5 games.
 UEFA Cup 1998–99 with FC Rotor Volgograd: 2 games.
 UEFA Cup 2000–01 with FC Dnipro Dnipropetrovsk: 1 game.

References

1968 births
Footballers from Dnipro
Living people
Russian footballers
Association football defenders
Ukrainian football managers
Soviet footballers
Ukrainian footballers
Soviet Top League players
Russian Premier League players
Ukrainian Premier League players
FC Dnipro players
FC Rotor Volgograd players
FC Amkar Perm players
FC Zorya Luhansk players